Pendarvis may refer to:

 Albert Pendarvis, minister
 Cleotis Pendarvis (born 1986), boxer 
 Janice Pendarvis, singer, songwriter, and voiceover artist
 Leon Pendarvis (born 1945), American musician
 Marvin R. Pendarvis, American politician
 Paul Pendarvis (1907–1987), American musician

See also
 Pendarves
 Pendarvis Williams (born 1991), basketball player
 Pendarvis (Mineral Point, Wisconsin), historic site in Wisconsin